Gannavaram mandal is one of the 25 mandals in Krishna district of the Indian state of Andhra Pradesh. It is under the administration of Gudivada revenue division and the mandal headquarters are located at Gannavaram. The mandal is bounded by Agiripalle, Bapulapadu, Unguturu, Vijayawada (rural) and Kankipadu mandals. The mandal is also a part of the Andhra Pradesh Capital Region under the jurisdiction of APCRDA.

Demographics 

 census, the mandal had a population of 87,027. The total population constitute, 43,172 males and 43,855 females —a sex ratio of 1016 females per 1000  
males. 8,098 children are in the age group of 0–6 years, of which 4,147 are boys and 3,951 are girls. The average literacy rate stands at 73.96% with 58,379 literates.

Towns and villages 

 census, the mandal has 24 villages and no towns. Gannavaram is the most populated and Venkatanarasimhapuram is the least populated villages in the mandal.

The settlements in the mandal are listed below:

See also 
List of villages in Krishna district

References

Mandals in Krishna district